The 1996 United States Senate special election in Oregon was held on January 30, 1996 to fill the seat vacated by Republican Bob Packwood, who had resigned from the Senate due to sexual misconduct allegations.

In the primaries held on December 5, 1995, Democratic U.S. Representative Ron Wyden and Republican President of the Oregon State Senate Gordon H. Smith were nominated. Wyden then defeated Smith in the general election. Smith would win the regularly-scheduled election to the Senate later that year and serve alongside Wyden until 2009. Wyden's victory made him the first Democratic Senator from Oregon since 1969, after Wayne Morse very narrowly lost re-election to Packwood.

Democratic primary

Candidates
 Peter DeFazio, U.S. Representative
 Michael Donnelly, businessman and President of Wild Oregon Water
 Anna Nevenic, nurse and perennial candidate
 J.J.T. Van Dooremolen
 Ron Wyden, U.S. Representative

Results

Republican primary

Candidates
 Sam Berry, attorney
 Brian Boquist, businessman and rancher
 Jeffrey Brady, dentist
 Valentine Christian, candidate for the U.S. Senate in 1992
 Robert J. Fenton
 Lex Loeb
 Norma Paulus, Oregon Superintendent of Public Instruction, former Oregon Secretary of State, and nominee for Governor of Oregon in 1986
 Jack Roberts, Commissioner of the Oregon Bureau of Labor and Industries
 Gordon H. Smith, President of the Oregon State Senate
 John Thomas, policeman
 Tony G. Zangaro

Results

General election

Results

See also 
 1996 United States Senate elections

References 

1996 special
Oregon special
Oregon 1996
Senate special
United States Senate 1996
Oregon
January 1996 events in the United States